Donald Campbell (19 October 1932 – September 2016) was an English professional footballer who played as a full back. He was born in Bootle and made over 200 appearances in the Football League between 1953 and 1964.

Career
Campbell played in the Football League for Liverpool, Crewe Alexandra and Gillingham, scoring three goals in 225 appearances. He later played non-league football for Folkestone Town (1964–1967), Margate (99 appearances in all competitions), and Canterbury City.

References

External links

Profile at LFC History

1932 births
2016 deaths
Sportspeople from Bootle
English footballers
Association football fullbacks
Liverpool F.C. players
Crewe Alexandra F.C. players
Gillingham F.C. players
Folkestone F.C. players
Margate F.C. players
Canterbury City F.C. players
English Football League players